The Thunder Lake Patrol Cabin is a small structure in Rocky Mountain National Park, Colorado. The one story one-room log cabin is not used in the winter, but does have a stove with a stone fireplace. The main cabin is gable-roofed, with a small shed-roofed porch, and is a good example of the National Park Service rustic style. The logs are saddle-notched, projecting an increasing distance at their ends from top to bottom.

The Thunder Lake Cabin was placed on the National Register of Historic Places on January 29, 1988.

See also
National Register of Historic Places listings in Boulder County, Colorado

References

Park buildings and structures on the National Register of Historic Places in Colorado
National Register of Historic Places in Rocky Mountain National Park
National Park Service rustic in Colorado
Government buildings completed in 1930
Buildings and structures in Boulder County, Colorado
National Park Service ranger stations
National Register of Historic Places in Boulder County, Colorado
1930 establishments in Colorado